The Northumberland Football Association  is a governing body in the historic county of Northumberland, England. The association was formed in 1883. It is responsible for the governance and development of football at all levels in the county.

History

In 1879 the joint Durham and Northumberland Football Association was founded and they stayed that way until 1883 when increasing numbers and travel problems necessitated a change. On 11 May 1883, 40 clubs met in the Alexandra Hotel in Newcastle and voted to form an independent body known as the Northumberland Football Association with the brief of 'using their influence to encourage new clubs to take up the game in their area'. At a subsequent meeting in September of the same year, Mr Robinson reported that he had managed to get the accounts in order and a loss of some four pounds would be divided between the two Counties. It was also agreed to pay Durham £15 for the existing Challenge Cup.

The first secretary of Northumberland Football Association was Aleck Peters and the Lord Bishop of Newcastle was the County FA's first President. Prominent clubs in the late 1800s were Tyne Association, Newcastle Rangers, Newcastle East End and Newcastle West End.

The Northern Football Association was formed as a rival to the Northumberland FA by 'country clubs' who saw the parent body as Tyneside-centric in 1888. The venture was short lived as the NFA talked the FA in London into not recognising the Northern as an official organisation, and it was strangled after just a couple of years of existence.

The rebel clubs that formed the Morpeth-based Northern Association included Amble, Burradon, Bedlington East End, Horncliffe, Berwick Rangers, Tweedside Wanderers, Newsham, Backworth, Broomhill, Warkworth, Blyth, Seaside Rovers, Morpeth Athletic, Weetslade, Longhirst, Spittal, Belford, Stobswood, Seaton Burn and the senior sides Morpeth Harriers and Shankhouse Black Watch. Ashington joined the rebels following season.

As the new Millennium arrived Northumberland FA became a Limited Company and in 2002–03 there was a move into their own new premises at Whitley Park with a County Ground included.

Organisation

The Association provides the appropriate structures and systems to enable the organisation to control, manage, regulate and promote the game within the county.

The Football Development Team assist in all aspects of football development ranging from support for Charter Standard Clubs to assistance with funding applications to further club/school development.

Affiliated leagues

Men's saturday leagues
Northern Football Alliance
Newcastle Corinthians League
North Northumberland League
North East Christian Fellowship League
Tyneside Amateur League

Men's sunday leagues
Blyth and Wansbeck Sunday League
Cramlington and District Sunday League
Hexham and District Sunday League
Newcastle Central Sunday Afternoon League
Northumberland U21 League

Other men's leagues
Newcastle Business League
Newcastle University Business League
Friday Night Elevens League

Ladies and girls leagues
Northumberland County Women's Football League
Northumberland Girls Football League

Youth leagues
Pinpoint Recruitment Jnr. Football League
Northumberland Youth League
Glendale League (Youth)
Newcastle Mini Soccer League
Northumberland Mini Soccer League.
Tynedale Mini Soccer League

Small sided leagues
Champion Soccer – Gosforth
Newcastle Futsal League - Walker
Power League – North Shields
SoccerWorld Newcastle

Disbanded or amalgamated leagues

Leagues that were affiliated to the Northumberland FA but have disbanded or amalgamated with other leagues include:

Ashington & District League
Blyth and District League
Coast Colts Junior Football League
Coquetdale League
East and West Tyne League
East Northumberland League
Hexham and District League  Amalgamated with the North Tyne league in 1971 to become The Hexham & North Tyne League which ceased to exist in 1999.
Mid-Tyne Amateur League
NEL-Tyneside Combination
Newcastle and District Trader league (later known as the Newcastle Business Houses League)
Newcastle and District United League
Northern Combination
North Eastern Amateur league (founded in 1923 and now amalgamated with Tyneside Amateur League)
South East Northumberland League (founded in 1921 and eventually incorporated in Tyneside Amateur League)
Tyneside League
Tyneside Munition Workers League (also known as the Tyneside Munitioneers' League)
Tyneside Works League
United Free Churches League

Affiliated member clubs

Among the notable clubs that are (or at one time were) affiliated to the Northumberland FA are:

Alnwick Town
Ashington
Bedlington Terriers
Blyth Spartans
Morpeth Town
Newcastle Benfield
Newcastle Blue Star (now defunct)
Newcastle East End (became NUFC)
Newcastle West End (became NUFC)
Newcastle United
North Shields
Ponteland United
Prudhoe Town
Ryton & Crawcrook Albion
Shankhouse
Team Northumbria (now defunct)
Walker Celtic (now defunct)
West Allotment Celtic
Whitley Bay

County Cup competitions

The Northumberland FA run the following Cup Competitions:

Northumberland Senior Cup
Northumberland Senior Benevolent Bowl
Northumberland Minor Cup
Northumberland Junior Cup
Northumberland Women's Cup
Northumberland Sunday Cup
Northumberland Sunday Minor Cup
Northumberland Sunday Junior Cup
Northumberland Tesco Girls U14 Cup
Northumberland Tesco Girls U16 Cup
Northumberland Rangers Cup
Northumberland Colts Cup
Northumberland Tesco Cup
Northumberland Cubs Cup
Northumberland Divisional Cup

Source

Senior Cup

The Northumberland Senior Cup is a county cup competition involving teams within the Northumberland Football Association.

List of recent Northumberland Cup winners

Source

Board & council members

Board members

 Steve Ord (President)
 Derek Booth (Vice President)
 Frank Scantlebury (Vice President)
 Andrew Rose-Cook (Acting Chief Executive)
 Lauri Chandler (Finance Director)
 Wilton Holmes (Director) 
 Paul Nesbitt (Director)
 Alistar Jenkins (Director)

Members of council

 Syd Johnson (Life Vice President) 
 Derek Booth (Vice President)
 Alex Smailes (Vice President)
 Frank Scantlebury (Vice President)
 George Watson (Honorary Life Member)
 David Tiffin (Honorary Life Member)
 Derek Breakwell (Northern League)
 George Penman (Northern Football Alliance) 
 Steve Swinbank (North East Combination League)
Fiona Robson (Northumberland County Women's League
 Graham Smith (North East Sunday League)
 Lee Scott (Pinpoint Recruitment Junior Leagues)
 Gary Trewick (Pinpoint Recruitment Junior Leagues)
 Louis Storey (Youth Football Development League)
 Stew Pringle (Cramlington Sunday League)
 Paul Nesbitt (Hexham and District Sunday Football League)
 Wilton Holmes (Tynedale Mini Soccer League)
 Colin Douglas (Blyth Sunday League)
 Chris Flynn (Independent Board Member)
 Alistair Jenkins (Independent Board Member)
 Richie Hines (Newcastle United)
 Jonathan Gray (Referee Association) 
 Jess Callaghan (IAG)

Key staff

Key Staff Members
 Andrew Rose-Cook (Acting Chief Executive)
 David Jones (Head of Participation) 
 Angela Barber (Head of Compliance) 
 Lynn Barber (Head of Administration) 
 Vacant (Head of Quality) 
 Kevin Azzopardi (Referee Development Officer) 
 Helen Beales (Marketing & Communications Officer)

References

External links 

County football associations
Football in Northumberland
Sports organizations established in 1883